Alincthun is a commune in the Pas-de-Calais department in the Hauts-de-France region of France.

Geography
The river Liane flows through the village.

Population

Sights
 The church of St. Denis, dating from the seventeenth century.
 The seventeenth-century Château du Fresnoy.
 Three 17th-century manor houses at La Guilbauderie, Le Fay and Bois-du-Coq.
 A water mill.

See also
Communes of the Pas-de-Calais department

References

Communes of Pas-de-Calais